Phytoecia nigriventris is a species of beetle in the family Cerambycidae. It was described by Hermann Julius Kolbe in 1893, originally under the genus Blepisanis. It has a wide distribution in Africa.

Subspecies
 Phytoecia nigriventris nigriventris (Kolbe, 1893)
 Phytoecia nigriventris dimidiata (Aurivillius, 1914)

References

Phytoecia
Beetles described in 1893
Taxa named by Hermann Julius Kolbe